The walaycho (hispanicized spelling hualaycho, also walaychu) is a small lute-like fretted stringed instrument, the smallest member of the charango family. It is the same or similar to the maulincho. The walaychu along with the charango and its variations were born in the 16th century among the Ayacucho regions  Peru and Potosí located in Bolivia.

The word walaychu is Quechua meaning 'a lazy man, someone who always lays on the ground everywhere. In addition to this, an evil man'. It's a colloquial word in Viceroyalty of Peru for a small charango variant.

References 

Charangos